Leg Work is an American police drama television series created by Frank Abatemarco that premiered on CBS on October 3, 1987. Ten episodes of the series were produced, of which six were aired prior to the show's cancellation. The final episode aired on November 7, 1987. The cable network TV Land later aired the remaining four episodes.

Synopsis
Set in New York City, the show's main character was Claire McCarron (played by Margaret Colin), a former Assistant D.A. turned private investigator. A policeman's daughter (Colin was a policeman's daughter in real life), she drove around town in a Porsche 911 Cabriolet but lived beyond her means and often struggled to make a living from her fledgling detective agency. The show also starred Patrick James Clarke as her brother and NYPD lieutenant Fred McCarron, and Frances McDormand as Willie Pipal, her friend who still worked for the DA's office.

Cast
 Margaret Colin as Claire McCarron
 Patrick James Clarke as Fred McCarron
 Frances McDormand as Willie Pipal
 Robert Dorfman as Jeffrey

Episodes

Reaction and ratings
Critical opinion was mixed.  It was described as having a "somewhat leering tone", but also the "best and brightest of CBS' new series" as well as being a seeming extension of Colin's 1985 lawyer sitcom, the equally short-lived Foley Square (in which Colin had played an assistant district attorney). However even before its premiere, critics anticipated a quick demise due to its difficult programming slot, on Saturday nights opposite NBC's The Golden Girls and Amen.  Ratings were indeed dismal, as in its five weeks on the air, Leg Work was always rated within the bottom five network shows every single week.  In its final airing it was ranked dead last, 71st out of 71 ranked shows that week.

Despite its brief run, Leg Work was shown in other countries outside of the US. It premiered in the UK on the ITV network (usually in a late Friday night slot) in Spring 1988.

References

External links 

Thrilling Detective: Claire McCarron

1980s American crime drama television series
1987 American television series debuts
1987 American television series endings
CBS original programming
Television series by 20th Century Fox Television
Television shows set in New York City
English-language television shows
American detective television series